= Robert Widders =

English author

Robert Widders is an English author, war historian, and veteran of all three British Armed Forces: the Royal Navy, British Army and Royal Air Force.

He was educated at Belle Vale Primary and Gateacre Comprehensive schools in Liverpool before starting a career in the armed forces.

Widders is an author of three books. His memoir, A Few Deeds Short of a Hero, recounts his life and experiences in the British Armed Forces. He has written two historical books on the contribution of Irish soldiers to the British Armed Forces during World War II, Spitting on a Soldier's Grave and The Emperor's Irish Slaves: Prisoners of the Japanese in the Second World War. Spitting on a Soldier's Grave is held in the collection of the Imperial War Museum.

== Bibliography ==
- A Few Deeds Short of a Hero: A candid account of life in the Armed Forces from one of the few men alive to have served in all three branches. Quartet, 2009. ISBN 0704371472.
- Spitting on a Soldier's Grave. Troubador, 2010. ISBN 1848764995.
- The Emperor's Irish Slaves: Prisoners of the Japanese in the Second World War. The History Press, February 2012. ISBN 1845887271.
